Fritz Eckhardt (born Linz, 30 November 1907; died Klosterneuburg, 31 December 1995) was an Austrian actor, director, and writer. He is remembered for playing the lead role as chief inspector Marek in the Österreichischer Rundfunk version of the detective series Tatort. He also played cabaret and wrote numerous theatre plays and film scripts.

Partial filmography

 The Last Enemy (1938)
 Singende Engel (1947) - Bürgermeister von Liechtenthal (uncredited)
  (1948) - Präsident von Bagatello
 The Angel with the Trumpet (1948)
 Nothing But Coincidence (1949)
 Der Schuß durchs Fenster (1950)
 Die Mitternachtsvenus (1951)
 Der Fünfminutenvater (1951) - Der Wirt
 Adventure in Vienna (1952) - Portier im Goldenen Löwen
 Abenteuer im Schloss (1952)
  (1952) - Weber
 Heute nacht passiert's (1953) - Studienrat Krickau
  (1953)
  (1953) - Department store boss
 The Last Bridge (1954) - Tilleke
  (1954) - Herr Malzl
 Marriage Sanitarium (1955) - Herr Rübsam
 His Daughter is Called Peter (1955) - Gendarmeriebeamter
 Sarajevo (1955) - Prof. Weissbacher
 Pulverschnee nach Übersee (1956) - Mister Frank Jones
 A Woman Who Knows What She Wants (1958) - Arpad Kelemen - Direktor 'Apollo'-Theater
 Solang' die Sterne glüh'n (1958) - Otto Runkelmann, Großmolkereibesitzer
 So ein Millionär hat's schwer (1958) - Wirt Napoleon
 Labyrinth (1959) - Khan
  (1959) - (uncredited)
 The Man Who Walked Through the Wall (1959) - Gefängnisdirektor
 Adorable Arabella (1959) - Hill, Bierbrauer
 The Good Soldier Schweik (1960) - Robert Wendler
 Mal drunter – mal drüber (1960) - Direktor Hummel
 Almost Angels (1962) - Father Fiala
 Miracle of the White Stallions (1963)
 Charley's Aunt (1963) - August Sallmann
 Walt Disney's Wonderful World of Color :  (1963, TV Series) -  Haslinger
  (1965) - Mr. Colloway
 Kurzer Prozess (1967) - Raimond Höfler
 The Reverend Turns a Blind Eye (1971) - Bischof
 Trouble with Trixie (1972) - Wiesinger sen.
 Der selige Herr aus dem Parlament (1976) - Bach
  (1994) - Chef der Kochschule (final film role)

Decorations and awards
 1987: Honorary Ring of the Vienna
 1983: Austrian Cross of Honour for Science and Art, 1st class
 1973: Gold Medal of the city of Vienna
 1974: Golden Camera

References

External links 

1907 births
1995 deaths
Austrian male television actors
Actors from Linz
Recipients of the Austrian Cross of Honour for Science and Art, 1st class
20th-century Austrian male actors
20th-century Austrian screenwriters
20th-century Austrian male writers
Writers from Linz